David W. Marsden (born April 5, 1948, in Alexandria, Virginia) is an American politician of the Democratic Party. He currently represents the 37th district in the Senate of Virginia, which is a portion of Fairfax County, since 2010. Between 2006 and 2010, he served in the Virginia House of Delegates representing the 41st district. Prior to his career in politics he spent 17 years as head of the Fairfax County Juvenile Detention Center until 1999. In 2000 Governor Jim Gilmore appointed him Chief Deputy and then Acting Director of the 2,700-person Virginia Department of Juvenile Justice. He then served for 6 months in the administration of Governor Mark Warner.

On January 12, 2010, Marsden defeated Steve Hunt in a special Senate election to replace Republican Ken Cuccinelli who was elected Attorney General the previous fall. On January 13, 2010, Marsden was sworn in. An additional special election was held March 2, 2010 to replace Marsden in the Virginia House of Delegates. It was won by Democrat Eileen Filler-Corn.

David W. Marsden graduated from W.T. Woodson High School in 1966 and Randolph-Macon College in 1970.

References

Sources

Dave Marsden for Delegate (Constituent/campaign website)
Dave Marsden for State Senate (Constituent/campaign website)

External links

Project Vote Smart - Representative Dave W. 'Dave' Marsden (VA) profile
Follow the Money - Dave W. Marsden
2005 campaign contributions
Washington Post - Dave W. Marsden local election 2008 profile

1948 births
Living people
Democratic Party members of the Virginia House of Delegates
Randolph–Macon College alumni
People from Burke, Virginia
Politicians from Alexandria, Virginia
21st-century American politicians
Democratic Party Virginia state senators